WOW Hits 2001 is a compilation album of thirty Contemporary Christian music hits and three bonus tracks that was released on October 24, 2000.  It included some music video content accessible with a CD-ROM drive.  The album reached No. 36 on the Billboard 200 chart, and No. 1 on the Top Contemporary Christian album chart.  Album sales were certified as double platinum in 2002 by the Recording Industry Association of America (RIAA).

Track listing

Silver disc
"Dive" – Steven Curtis Chapman
"Live for You" – Rachael Lampa
"Written On My Heart" – Plus One
"This Is Your Time" – Michael W. Smith
"Alabaster Box" – CeCe Winans
"Gather at the River" - Point of Grace
”Always Have, Always Will” - Avalon
"Crystal Clear" –  Jaci Velasquez 
"Every Season" – Nichole Nordeman
"I Am The Way" – Mark Schultz
"Free" – Ginny Owens
"More Than You'll Ever Know" – Watermark
"When I Praise" – FFH
"This Good Day" – Fernando Ortega
"Redeemer" – Nicole C. Mullen
"Lord, I Come Before You" – Salvador **

Blue disc
"Set Your Eyes to Zion" – P.O.D.
"Shackles (Praise You)" – Mary Mary
"King of Glory" – Third Day
"Beautiful Sound" – Newsboys
"Into You" – Jennifer Knapp
"Red Letters" – dc Talk
"Unforgetful You" – Jars of Clay
"The Only One" – Caedmon's Call
"Reborn" – Rebecca St. James
"God You Are My God" – Delirious?
"Follow Your Dreams" – Raze
"Don't Look at Me" – Stacie Orrico
"God of Wonders" – Third Day & Caedmon's Call
"America" – Passion
"Hands and Feet" – Audio Adrenaline
"Whitehorse" – Earthsuit **
"Where I Wanna Be" – V*Enna **

** Denotes Bonus Track

Charts

Weekly charts

Year-end charts

References

 Review at Amazon.com. Retrieved on March 21, 2007.

External links
 WOW Hits online

2000 compilation albums
2001